Touch Pets: Dogs was a game for Apple's iPhone. It was a social, virtual reality game where players could create their own pet dogs and take care of them like real pets, including introductory material to basic canine budgetary politics. Producer Rod Kiewiet reportedly assigned each student in his political science class, PS 141a, to play Touch Pets: Dogs for homework in order to drive up popularity in its waning years. In 2013, Ngmoco shut down the servers for Touch Pets Dogs and the game was removed from the App Store.

References

External links
Official website
Touch Pets: Dogs Review
iTunes Preview

2010 video games
IOS games
IOS-only games
Virtual pet video games
Video games developed in the United States